Nigel Whitehouse is a Welsh rugby union referee. He has refereed 26 Heineken Cup matches and 13 Amlin Challenge Cup matches between 1996 and 2006, as well as international matches.

References

Living people
Welsh rugby union referees
Six Nations Championship referees
EPCR Challenge Cup referees
European Rugby Champions Cup referees
Year of birth missing (living people)